Mojmír Trebuňák (born 30 January 1993 in Košice) is a Slovak football winger for Slávia TU Košice.

Career

MFK Košice
He made his debut for the club in a 4–2 home Corgoň Liga win against FC Nitra, coming on as a 70'th minute substitution.

Slávia TU Košice
On 10 September 2019, Trebuňák joined Slávia TU Košice.

External links
MFK Košice profile

References

1993 births
Living people
Slovak footballers
Association football forwards
FC VSS Košice players
1. FC Tatran Prešov players
Slávia TU Košice players
2. Liga (Slovakia) players
Slovak Super Liga players
Sportspeople from Košice